Matti Hannola (born 12 February 1939 in Viipuri) is a Finnish farmer and politician. He was a Member of the Parliament of Finland from March to September 1975, representing the Finnish People's Unity Party (SKYP).

References

1939 births
Living people
Politicians from Vyborg
Finnish People's Unity Party politicians
Members of the Parliament of Finland (1972–75)